Isabel Carrasco Lorenzo (4 March 1955 – 12 May 2014) was a Spanish politician of the People's Party. Carrasco served in the Senate of Spain between 2003 and 2007. At the time of her death, Carrasco was the head of the government in the northwestern Province of León, and the head of the People's Party in the province. She was murdered in May 2014 as she walked from her home to a political party meeting.

Murder 
Carrasco was shot as she crossed a bridge over the Bernesga River in León. Mariano Rajoy, the Prime Minister of Spain and the head of the People's Party, cancelled engagements in the wake of her death. A mother and daughter were later arrested in conjunction with Carrasco's death. The daughter had recently been fired from the council, the mother testifying in the court trial that her daughter was let go from her job because she refused to have sex with Carrasco. The women were the wife and daughter of a police chief in the province of León. On 20 February 2016 Montserrat González, her daughter Triana Martínez and local police officer Raquel Gago, a friend of Martínez, were found guilty of planning and carrying out the murder of Carrasco.

References

1955 births
2014 deaths
Assassinated Spanish politicians
Deaths by firearm in Spain
People murdered in Spain
People's Party (Spain) politicians
Violence against women in Spain
People from León, Spain
Deputation Presidents of León
Members of the Senate of Spain
21st-century Spanish politicians
21st-century Spanish women politicians
Members of the 5th Cortes of Castile and León
Government ministers of Castile and León
Spanish municipal councillors
Members of the 6th Cortes of Castile and León